Eyes Wide Open is the debut studio album by American singer Sabrina Carpenter. It was released by Hollywood Records on April 14, 2015. Carpenter began planning the project in 2014, after she launched her debut EP Can't Blame a Girl for Trying, she wanted to make a full-length LP. All the tracks on that EP were included on the album. The album was recorded from 2013 - 2015 with the majority of the album being recorded in 2014. Musically, Eyes Wide Open is a pop record with folk, pop rock and teen pop influences. Its production consists on guitars, piano, drums and keyboards. In general, the album talks about Carpenter's personal experiences, friendship, love and teenage problems.

The album received positive reviews from music critics and debuted at number 43 on the US Billboard 200, number 31 on the US Billboard Top Album Sales chart, and number 14 on the US Billboard Digital Albums chart. The album sold over 12,000 copies in its first week release. Eyes Wide Open produced two singles, "We'll Be the Stars", released on January 13, 2015 and the titled-track "Eyes Wide Open", released on April 7, 2015.

Background and recording
Carpenter became heavily involved with the Disney Channel in 2013, making various appearances on soundtracks like "Smile" for the album Disney Fairies: Faith, Trust, and Pixie Dust and "All You Need", featured on the Sofia the First soundtrack. In that same year, Carpenter signed a record deal with Hollywood Records to release her own music. Carpenter was planning to launch an EP and then release a studio album. She released her debut EP Can't Blame a Girl for Trying with four tracks in March 2014.

Music and lyrics
The final cut of Eyes Wide Open contains twelve tracks, four of them were in Carpenter’s debut EP Can't Blame a Girl for Trying. The album is a teen pop and pop folk record, full of acoustic and country styles. It embodies influences of pop rock, power pop and Hawaiian folk. In all of the songs Carpenter talks about personal experiences, friendship, love and teenage problems. Four songs were written by Carpenter.

Eyes Wide Open begins with the title track “Eyes Wide Open”. The song demonstrates a "darker mood" where Carpenter sings about finding who she is and her path. Her favorite lyric on the album is the opening lyric of “Eyes Wide Open” that says "Everybody loves to tell me / I was born an old soul." "Can't Blame a Girl for Trying" is an acoustic guitar-pop folk song who talks the being foolish in love and making mistakes, but never blaming those who make them. According to Carpenter the song "perfectly describes a thirteen-year-old girl and a teenage girl." The third track, "The Middle of Starting Over" has country pop influences. The song talks about moving on, start all over again and forget the mistakes. "The Middle of Starting Over" was compared to Taylor Swift's work in her early albums.

The last song of Carpenter's new material, "Darling I'm a Mess", was the first song to be recorded for Eyes Wide Open. The Hawaiian folk song was co-written by Meghan Trainor and lyrically, it talks about the feeling of being friend zoned. A folk-pop guitar-driven ballad, "White Flag" talks about changes in our daily life and that none of the bad things we do will last forever. The song has the last to be recorded for Can’t Blame a Girl for Trying. The last track of the record, "Best Thing I Got" is a piano driven-pop song with jazz influences. Lyrically, the song talks about love and "being a non-perfect girl who wants life to be full of freedom.”

Singles
The album's lead single, "We'll Be the Stars", was released on January 13, 2015. It made its radio premiere via Radio Disney a day earlier.

Carpenter made the lead track off of the album, "Eyes Wide Open", available for those who pre-ordered the album on iTunes on April 7, 2015. It was released as the album's second single, with the music video premiering on June 14, 2015. In 2016, the song won the Radio Disney Music Award for "Best Anthem".

Critical reception
Writing for the website Headline Planet, Brian Cantor gave the album a positive review, focusing on the emotion conveyed by Sabrina Carpenter's performance. He wrote, "Decidedly loose in construct but rich in personality, Eyes Wide Open provides Carpenter with an opportunity to establish her own identity and leave her own mark." Cantor believed the more heavily produced songs put Carpenter at a disadvantage, playing against her strengths. In particular, he singled out "Eyes Wide Open" and "We'll Be the Stars" as weaker songs on the album that do not showcase Carpenter's talents and personality to their full potential. "With every passing moment–even on her weaker tracks–" Cantor wrote, "Carpenter creates distance between the conception and reality of a teen artist."

Chart performance
The album debuted at number 43 on the US Billboard 200, number 31 on the US Billboard Top Album Sales chart, and number 14 on the US Billboard Digital Albums chart. According to Billboard and Nielsen SoundScan, the album sold over 12,000 copies in its first week release.

Track listing

Notes
 signifies an additional vocal producer
 signifies a co-producer
 signifies a vocal producer
 signifies an additional producer

Credits and personnel
Credits adapted from the liner notes of Eyes Wide Open.

Recorded, engineered, mixed and mastered at

 North Hollywood, California 
 Sherman Oaks, California 
 Los Angeles, California 
 West Los Angeles, California 
 Gordon Studio DK
 Ojai, California 

Performers and production

 Sabrina Carpenter – vocals ; backing vocals 
 Eric Boulanger – mastering 
 Mitch Allan – production, vocal production, guitar, bass, programming, backing vocals 
 Jerrod Bettis – production, additional engineering, programming 
 Tony Maserati – mixing 
 Scott Robinson – additional engineering 
 Dan Book – additional vocal production 
 Meghan Kabir – backing vocals 
 Brian Malouf – production, keyboards ; mixing ; drum programming ; additional percussion 
 Chris Thompson – engineering 
 Jim McGorman – acoustic guitar, electric guitar, bass ; glockenspiel, hand percussion ; co-production, piano, keyboards 
 Robb Valler – co-production, backing vocals 
 Marc Slutsky – drums 
 Daniel Kalisher – mandolin 
 Michelle Moyer – backing vocals 
 Steven Solomon – production, mixing 
 Captain Cuts – production, mixing 
 Matthew Tishler – production, piano, bass, programming 
 Vic Florencia – mixing 
 Justin Abedin – guitars 
 Greg Critchley – drums 
 Lindsey Lee – backing vocals 
 Jon Ingoldsby – production, mixing, all instruments 
 Sarah Carpenter – additional backing vocals ; backing vocals 
 Jon Levine – production, mixing engineering, piano, organ, glockenspiel, bass, programming 
 Dan Piscina – engineering 
 Jon Sosin – guitar, ukulele 
 Jordan Higgins – production, engineering, vocal production, arrangement, all instruments, programming 
 Lindsay Rush – vocal production, arrangement 
 Aaron Sterling – drums, drum programming 
 Curt Schneider – bass 
 Michael Ward – guitars 
 Zac Rae – keyboards 
 Matt Squire – production, mixing, all instruments 
 Steve Tippeconic – additional production, all instruments 
 Scott Harris – additional production 
 Larry Goetz – all instruments, engineering 
 John Gordon – production, mixing, programming, guitars, piano, additional instruments 
 Sune Haansbaek – mixing, additional guitar 
 Julie Frost – vocal production 
 Kim Thomsen – drums 
 Mikkel Riber – bass 

Design
 Rebecca Miller – photography
 Anabel Sinn – art direction, design
 Enny Joo – art direction, design

Charts

Release history

References

External links
 Eyes Wide Open at SabrinaCarpenter.com

2015 debut albums
Albums produced by Matt Squire
Hollywood Records albums
Sabrina Carpenter albums